Goff is a surname with several distinct origins, mainly Germanic, Celtic, Jewish, and French. It is the 946th most common family name in the United States. When the surname originates from England it is derived from an occupational name from German, Welsh, Cornish and Breton. The German Goff means a godly person, a strong warrior, or a priest. The Welsh gof and the Breton goff means "smith" (cognate with Irish gobha). The English-originating surname is common in East Anglia, where it is of Breton origin. The Welsh name is a variant of the surname Gough, and is derived from a nickname for someone with red hair. The native Irish name is derived from a patronymic form of the Gaelic personal name Eochaidh/Eachaidh, which means "horseman".

Notable people
 Barbara Goff, classics professor
 Bruce Goff, architect
 Darius Goff (1809–1891), industrialist and businessman
 Frederick R. Goff (1916–1982), librarian
 Greg Goff, American college baseball coach
 Guy D. Goff (1866–1933), US Senator from West Virginia
 H. N. Goff, American politician and businessman
 Harper Goff, American artist, musician, and actor
 Harriet Newell Kneeland Goff (1828–1901), American author, temperance reformer
 Helen Lyndon Goff author, better known as P. L. Travers the creator of Mary Poppins
 Jared Goff, American football quarterback
 Jacques Le Goff, French historian
 Jerry Goff, American baseball player
 John William Goff (1848–1924), American lawyer and politician from New York
 John William Goff (baseball) (1925–2009), American baseball player
 Jonathan Goff, American football player
 Keli Goff, American journalist, playwright and screenwriter
 Kellen Goff, American voice actor
 Kenneth Goff, American anti-communist
 Martyn Goff (1923–2015), British author, bookseller and literary administrator
 Mike Goff (baseball), professional baseball player/manager
 Mike Goff (American football), American football player
 Nathan Goff Jr., member of the United States Congress
 Phil Goff, former leader of the Labour Party of New Zealand
 Philip Goff (philosopher), British philosopher
 Ray Goff, American football player and coach
 Reginald Goff (1907–1980), English judge
 Robert Goff (football player), American football player
 Robert Goff, Baron Goff of Chieveley (1926–2016), British judge and law lord
 Sir Park Goff, 1st Baronet, British Conservative party politician, MP
 Sidney Clayton Goff (1861–1935), American dentist and politician
 Stan Goff (born 1951), author
 Thomas Goff (1867–1949), Irish/English landowner and politician
 Thomas William Goff (1829–1876), Irish Conservative party politician, MP
 Trish Goff (born 1976), fashion model

References

External links
 Goff/Gough Surname DNA Study
 Most Common Surnames in the U.S.
 The Goff Surname, Ancestry.com
 The Gough Surname, Ancestry.com
 The McGough Surname, Ancestry.com
  The Goff-Gough Family Association

See also
 Le Goff, another surname

German-language surnames
Cornish-language surnames
Breton-language surnames
Occupational surnames
Dutch-language surnames
Jewish surnames
English-language surnames
French-language surnames